36 Gunn is an Indian Marathi language film directed by Samit Kakkad. The film stars Santosh Juvekar, Vijay Patkar, Purva Pawar and Pushkar Shrotri. Music by Ajit Parab. The film was released on 4 November 2022.

Cast 
 Santosh Juvekar as Sudhir
 Purva Pawar as Kriya
 Vaibhav Raj Gupta as Fardeen
 Pushkar Shrotri as Marriage counsellor Godbole
 Vijay Patkar as Nanu
 Swati Bovalekar as Sudhir’s grandmother

Production 
Principal photography began on 10 January 2019.

Soundtrack

Critical response 
36 Gunn film received positive reviews from critics. Mihir Bhanage of The Times of India gave the film 3 stars out of 5 and wrote "36 Gunn is a decent watch for the young audience. With a better climax and crisper editing, this one would've been even better". Aarti Vilas Borade of Hindustan Times gave the film 3.5 stars out of 5 and wrote "Overall 36 Gunn this film will feel close to today's audience". KalpeshRaj Kubal of Maharashtra Times gave the film 3 stars out of 5 and wrote "There is a kind of 'feel good factor' in this movie. The newly married couple and those who want to get married should watch this movie '36 Gunn'.

References

External links
 

2022 films
2020s Marathi-language films
Indian drama films